Reiner Stach (born 1951) is a German author, biographer of Franz Kafka, publisher, and publicist. Stach lives and works as a freelancer in Berlin.

Early life and education 
Stach was born in Rochlitz, Saxony. He studied philosophy, literature, and mathematics at the Johann Wolfgang Goethe University in Frankfurt am Main. Stach graduated in 1985 with a PhD. His dissertation was titled Kafkas erotischer Mythos. Eine ästhetische Konstruktion des Weiblichen (Kafka's erotic myth. An aesthetic construction of femininity).

Career

First Stach worked for major publishers as a science editor and publisher of nonfiction. He published several essays and reviews about the works of Hans Henny Jahnn and Franz Kafka, in various journals and anthologies, such as in the Neue Rundschau and in Revista de Libros, Madrid. He discovered the estate of Kafka's fiancée Felice Bauer in the United States and showed it as an exhibit "Kafka's Bride" in Frankfurt, Vienna, and Prague, among other places, during 1998 and 1999.

While Kafka had a relatively small literary output, his influence is so immense that Stach estimates there are at least 130,000 web sites devoted to him. Stach stopped his own internet count of Kafka sites when he got to 500 of them. There are dozens of Kafka biographies. Stach decided to write a detailed Kafka biographical trilogy because despite all this, "No definitive biography of Franz Kafka exists".

Stach divided his biography of Kafka into three volumes: from birth to age 27 (1910), the period when he wrote his most famous works (1910–1915), and everything thereafter (1916–1924). However, obtaining enough suitable research material for the period covering early family, childhood, adolescence, and early adulthood (1883–1910), relies in part on obtaining access to the estate of Max Brod in Tel Aviv, which has so far largely been inaccessible to research due to legal issues. Consequently, Stach decided to start writing this trilogy with period 1910–1915, the years Kafka's diaries start, so the first volume covers second chronological period. It took Stach about 10 years to write this volume. The first published volume of his Kafka biography, covering the years 1910 to 1915, appeared in 2002 as Kafka – Die Jahre der Entscheidungen (Kafka: The Decisive Years, literally: The years of decisions). This was translated into English in 2005 by Shelley Frisch. The second published volume, Kafka – Die Jahre der Erkenntnis (Kafka: The Years of Realization or "insight"), appeared in 2008, dealing with the last eight years of Kafka's life. This volume was published in English in late 2011. The final volume, covering the earliest chronological period, was published in German in 2014. An English translation of this volume by Shelley Frisch is slated for October 2016. The trilogy has been described as "massive" and going "into painstaking detail".

In 2008 he won a Special prize of the Heimito von Doderer-Literaturpreis for his biography Kafka – Die Jahre der Erkenntnis.

Selected works 

 (Dissertation, Johann Wolfgang Goethe-Universität Frankfurt am Main, 1985)

 (Audio Book)

References

External links 
 
 Im Gespräch: Reiner Stach War Kafkas Leben kafkaesk? Interview in the FAZ, 29 June 2008 
[http://nbn-resolving.de/urn:nbn:de:bsz:352-opus-87759 Online-Version von "Die Ordnung der Unterwelt"] Zum Verhältnis von Autor, Text und Leser am Beispiel von Hans Henny Jahnns "Fluss ohne Ufer" und den Interpretationen seiner Deuter 

1951 births
Living people
Franz Kafka scholars
German publishers (people)
German public relations people
German male novelists